Cryptocephalus cerinus is a species of case-bearing leaf beetle in the family Chrysomelidae. It is found in North America.

Subspecies
These two subspecies belong to the species Cryptocephalus cerinus:
 Cryptocephalus cerinus cerinus B. White, 1937
 Cryptocephalus cerinus nevadensis B. White, 1937

References

Further reading

 
 
 

cerinus
Articles created by Qbugbot
Beetles described in 1937